True Heart is a 1997 American adventure film directed by Catherine Cyran and starring Kirsten Dunst as Bonnie and Zachery Ty Bryan as Sam.

Plot summary
True Heart tells the story of a brother and sister who survive a plane crash that kills the pilot and their guardian and strands them in British Columbia's wilderness. They are rescued by an Aboriginal Canadian man named Khonanesta (August Schellenberg) who claims there are "bad people" (a group of bear poachers) in the forest and tells them they must get away. He leads them on a trip through the wilderness away from poachers to find their parents.

The children are eventually reunited with their parents (Michael Gross and Dey Young), who then mistakenly accuse Khonanesta of being a poacher. The man refers to "Grandfather" a bear, as a member of his people.  The children clear him of the accusation.

Reception
DVD & Movie Guide gave the movie three-and-a-half stars, saying that it was "perfect for family viewing".

References

External links

1990s adventure films
1997 drama films
1997 films
Films shot in British Columbia
Films about bears
Orion Pictures films
1999 drama films
1999 films
1990s English-language films
American adventure drama films
Films directed by Catherine Cyran
1990s American films